Ahram (also Romanized as Ahrom) is a city in the Central District of Tangestan County, Bushehr province, Iran, and serves as capital of the county. At the 2006 census, its population was 12,182 in 2,710 households. The following census in 2011 counted 13,778 people in 3,433 households. The latest census in 2016 showed a population of 15,198 people in 4,263 households.

References 

Cities in Bushehr Province
Populated places in Tangestan County